Three Kings is a 2011 Indian Malayalam-language slapstick comedy caper film directed by V. K. Prakash and starring Jayasurya, Kunchacko Boban and Indrajith Sukumaran in lead roles alongside Samvrutha Sunil, Sandhya, Ann Augustine, Jagathy Sreekumar, Ashokan, Suraj Venjaramoodu and Salim Kumar in supporting roles. In the film, Three estranged brothers, who are also princes in a royal family, set out on a journey in search of a treasure. However, a mysterious revelation sorts out all the conflict between them.

Few comedy sequences of the film were based on the 2007 Hindi film Dhamaal.

Plot
Shanku, Ram and Bhaskar are three cousins from a royal family  who always fight with each other from childhood. None of them allows others to prosper and creates trouble for each other in whatever they do. Their parents have taken money from a money lender called Dinakaran who has given the money on the lease of the place. When the debts increased, the three realized that they cannot repay the money and get back the palace and so they try to steal the papers from Dinakaran's house with the help of his daughters who are the girlfriends of the three kings. But Dinakaran catches them and hands them over to the police.

In the police lockup, they happen to hear from a blind man that there is a treasure hidden somewhere in the Mysore forest which belonged to their family. He says that this was hidden by Tipu Sultan centuries back. He can help them if they promise to give him a portion of it. But that night, his illness becomes worse and he dies on his way to the hospital, but he hands the three a map of the treasure before he leaves the cell.

The three kings leave to Mysore to find the treasure. Each of them takes a different route and tries to be there first and make the treasure their own, but ultimately they have join hands because each of them had only one portion of the map which they split while having a fight in the police lockup. Finally they finds the treasure but it turns out that everything was a forged play and they were part of a reality show which a popular channel organized. They all end up humiliated because cameras were following them every moment and caught all their fights on camera and broadcast it.

But during one of the fights they had inside the cave, it turns out that the three kings misplaced the gold idol kept by the channel and took the real golden idol itself. This makes them all rich and they take back the palace from the money lender. The three kings get married with their girlfriends and they gets three kids. In the final scene, it is shown that their three kids are also fighting with each other the same way their fathers did when they were kids showing us that the legacy continues.

Cast

Soundtrack
The soundtrack of the film, was  composed by Ouseppachan, features 4 comic-genre songs.

References

2010s Malayalam-language films
2011 comedy films
2011 films
Indian comedy films
Films directed by V. K. Prakash
Films scored by Ouseppachan